Callomecyna tigrinula is a species of beetle in the family Cerambycidae. It was described by Holzschuh in 1999.

References

Apomecynini
Beetles described in 1999